Süleýman Çariýarowiç  Muhadow (born 24 December 1993 in Ashgabat, Turkmenistan) is a professional Turkmen football player who plays for Khujand. He is the son of former Turkmen international footballer Çaryýar Muhadow.

Club career
A graduate of the football school Olimp Ashgabat, he began his career at HTTU Aşgabat. In 2013, he won the Turkmenistan Super Cup followed by the Eskişehir Cup 2013. At the end of the season he won the gold medal in the 2013 Ýokary Liga and was the second top scorer of Turkmenistan (23 goals).

On 6 May 2014 he made his debut in the 2014 AFC President's Cup against Tatung F.C. and scored 2 goals. Afterwards he scored once against Rimyongsu Sports Club and, in the third match, scored twice against Ceres. On 7 June 2014 he scored five times against FC Daşoguz in the Championship of Turkmenistan. In the final stage of the 2014 AFC President's Cup he scored a hat-trick against Manang Marshyangdi Club (3–1) and scored 2 goals against «Sri Lanka Air Force» (2–1). In the cup final he scored the winning goal against Rimyongsu Sports Club (2–1) and won the trophy for the first time, as well as being recognized as tournament MVP and top scorer (11 goals). He was the third top scorer of the 2014 Ýokary Liga (25 goals).

In 2015, he moved to FC Altyn Asyr and on 10 February 2015 he made his debut for the club in the 2015 AFC Cup against Al-Saqr.

At the beginning of 2019, Muhadow featured for FC Istiklol during their preseason training camp in Turkey, playing in a match against HB Køge. In April, he was interested in Indonesian Persib Bandung. However, in August 2019 Muhadow was banned by the AFC for four years for a doping violation at the 2019 AFC Asian Cup.

International career
Participated in the 2013 Commonwealth of Independent States Cup for the U19 national team.

Muhadow made his senior national team debut on 24 October 2012 against Vietnam. Muhadow scored his first international goal on 28 October 2012 against Laos.

Career statistics

International

Statistics accurate as of match played 9 November 2016

International goals

Honours
Ýokary Liga:
Winner: 2013

AFC President's Cup:
Winner: 2014

Individual
 2014 AFC President's Cup Top Scorer
 2014 AFC President's Cup Most Valuable Player

References

External links
 
 

Living people
1993 births
Turkmenistan footballers
Association football forwards
Sportspeople from Ashgabat
Turkmenistan international footballers
2019 AFC Asian Cup players
Doping cases in association football
FC Ahal players